Diplotaxis moerens is a species of scarab beetle in the family Scarabaeidae. It is found in Central America and North America.

Subspecies
These two subspecies belong to the species Diplotaxis moerens:
 Diplotaxis moerens moerens LeConte, 1856
 Diplotaxis moerens peninsularis Fall, 1909

References

Further reading

 

Melolonthinae
Articles created by Qbugbot
Beetles described in 1856